Cantabrian Nationalist Council (Cantabrian: Conceju Nacionaliegu Cántabru, CNC) is a political party with a nationalist and left-wing ideology. It was formed in Cantabria in 1995.

History
The Conceju Nacionaliegu Cántabru (CNC) is a nationalist political party of Cantabria. The CNC was founded in 1995 and held its first congress in 1996 at Torrelavega The first name of the party was Conceju Cantabrista (CoC, Cantabrist Council), an assembly-based nationalist and leftist Cantabrian political party, with its headquarters in Torrelavega. In 1998 the party changed the name to its current form.
In 1999 they presented lists to the local elections, and won 1,149 votes in the municipalities of Santander, Barcena de Cicero and Bareyo. In the general elections of 2000 they won 2,103 votes. In 2001 the CNC announced a demonstration for the Day of Cantabria, but it was banned by the authorities. In the 2003 Cantabrian elections, the CNC obtained 1,670 votes in the regional elections and 1.131 in the local ones (presented lists in Santander (640 votes, 0.63%), Torrelavega (194 votes, 0.55%), Camargo (135 votes, 0.86%), Colindres (61 votes, 1.34%), Medio Cudeyo (12 votes, 0.28%), Comillas (32 votes, 1.79%), Barcena de Cicero (32 votes, 1.73%) and Alfoz of Lloredo (25 votes, 1.32%) and candidates in the concejos of Cicero, Hermosa and Zurita).

Elections

References

External links
Conceju Nacionaliegu Cántabru

Political parties in Cantabria
Nationalist parties in Spain
Socialist parties in Spain
Left-wing nationalist parties